is a railway station on the Shinano Railway Line in Komoro, Nagano, Japan, jointly operated by the third-sector railway operating company Shinano Railway and JR East. It is managed by the Shinano Railway.

Lines
Komoro Station is served by the Shinano Railway Line and is 22.0 kilometers from the starting point of the line at Karuizawa Station. It is also a station on the Koumi Line, and is 78.9 kilometers from the starting point of that line at Kobuchizawa Station. From 1926 to 1936, the station was also used by the now defunct Nunobiki Electric Railway(ja).

Station layout
The station consists of one ground-level side platform and two island platforms serving five tracks, connected to the station building by a footbridge. May 2018, the three elevators were installed and the barrier-free environment was completed. The station has a Midori no Madoguchi staffed ticket office.

Platforms

History
The station opened on 1 December 1888.

Passenger statistics
In fiscal 2015, the JR East portion of the  station was used by an average of 1,650 passengers daily (boarding passengers only).  The Shinano Railway portion of the station was used by 3,167 passengers in Fiscal 2015.

Surrounding area
Komoro ekimae Koban
Komoro City Hall
Komoro City Library
Asama Nanroku Komoro Medical Center
Komoro Aioi Post Office
Komoro Castle Site (Kaikoen)
Komoro Grand Castle Hotel 
Nakadana-Sô (Ryokan)
Nishiura-Dam (TEPCO)

Bus routes
JR Bus Expressway and route bus
For Shinjuku Station 
For Takamine Mountain Resort
Seibu Kanko Bus
For Ikebukuro Station
Chikuma Bus
For Tachikawa Station
For Universal Studios Japan

See also
 List of railway stations in Japan

References

External links

 Shinano Railway Komoro Station 
 JR East Komoro Station 

Railway stations in Japan opened in 1888
Railway stations in Nagano Prefecture
Shinano Railway Line
Koumi Line
Komoro, Nagano